Bigland Barrow is a hill in the English Lake District, near Backbarrow, Cumbria. It is the subject of a chapter of Wainwright's book The Outlying Fells of Lakeland. It reaches , and there is a concrete lookout tower on the summit which Wainwright describes as "a wartime relic".  Wainwright's route is an anticlockwise circuit from Newby Bridge.

References

Fells of the Lake District